Candidatus Wirthbacteria is a proposed bacterial phylum containing only one known sample from the Crystal Geyser aquifer, Ca. Wirthibacter wanneri. This bacterium stands out in a basal position in some trees of life as it is closely related to Candidate phyla radiation but is not considered part of that clade.

References 

Bacteria described in the 21st century
Candidatus taxa
Bacteria phyla